The Dower House, Sarsgrove Wood is a Grade II* listed house in Sarsgrove Wood, Churchill, Oxfordshire, England (near Chipping Norton).

The house has been Grade II* listed since 1985.

It is home to merchant banker Roddie Fleming and his family.

References

Country houses in Oxfordshire
Grade II* listed buildings in Oxfordshire
Grade II* listed houses